Joshua Cole Hamilton (born June 9, 1969) is an American actor. He received a nomination for the Independent Spirit Award for Best Supporting Male for his performance in hit indie film Eighth Grade.

Early life and career 
Hamilton was born in New York City, the son of actors Sandra Kingsbury and Dan Hamilton. His former stepmother was actress Stephanie Braxton. 

His Broadway credits include Proof and The Coast of Utopia (2007, Lincoln Center). Hamilton performed in The Cherry Orchard at the Brooklyn Academy of Music in January and February 2009, alongside Ethan Hawke, who was his co-star in the 1993 film Alive. In November 2010, it was announced that both Hamilton (Tom) and Dane Cook (Carter) would star in Neil Labute's Fat Pig. This marked Labute's Broadway directorial debut. In 2011 Hamilton starred as Torvald in Henrik Ibsen's A Doll's House at the Williamstown Theatre Festival. Hamilton has also performed on PRI's Selected Shorts, reading Neil Gaiman's story "The Thing About Cassandra". In late 2012, he appeared on Broadway in Theresa Rebeck's short-lived new comedy Dead Accounts, starring Katie Holmes and Norbert Leo Butz.

Filmography

Film

Television

References

External links
 
 
 

1969 births
20th-century American male actors
21st-century American male actors
American male child actors
American male film actors
American male stage actors
American male television actors
American male voice actors
Daytime Emmy Award winners
Living people
Male actors from New York City